Gualtiero is the name of:

 Gualtiero Bassetti (born 1942), Italian prelate
 Gualtiero Calboli (born 1932), Italian classicist and linguist
 Gualtiero De Angelis (1899–1980), Italian actor and voice actor
 Gualtiero Driussi (1920–1996), Italian politician and syndicalist
 Gualtiero Giori (1913–1992), Italian security printer and inventor
 Gualtiero Jacopetti (1919–2011), Italian documentary film director
 Gualtiero Marchesi (1930–2017), Italian chef
 Gualtiero Negrini (born 1961), American conductor, filmmaker, singer, actor, director and vocal coach
 Gualtiero Piccinini (born 1970), Italian-American philosopher
 Gualtiero Tumiati (1876–1971), Italian actor and stage director
 Gualtiero Zanolini, volunteer member of the World Scout Committee

See also
 Walter of Palearia (died 1229 or 1231), chancellor of the Kingdom of Sicily

Italian masculine given names